Anhelina Lomachynska (born 2 September 1996, Khmelnytskyi Oblast) is a Ukrainian weightlifter. She is a silver medalist at the European Weightlifting Championships.

Career 
Lomachynska participated in the 2017 Summer Universiade in Taipei where she finished 7th in the 48 kg category after lifting 73 kg in snatch and 87 in clean & jerk (160 in total). She won gold in the 48 kg category at the 2018 European U23 Championships. One year later, she was second.

Lomachynska debuted at the senior level in 2021 when she finished 5th in the 45 kg category at the 2021 European Weightlifting Championships held in Moscow, Russia After she had changed the weight category to 49 kg, she won a silver medal at the 2022 European Weightlifting Championships held in Tirana, Albania.

Major results

Personal life 
Lomachynska resides in Bila Tserkva and works as sports instructor for the Armed Forces of Ukraine.

References

External links 
 

1996 births
Living people
Sportspeople from Khmelnytskyi Oblast
Ukrainian female weightlifters
European Weightlifting Championships medalists
21st-century Ukrainian women